"One More Chance" is a hip-hop song by American rapper will.i.am, released as the second single from his third solo album, Songs About Girls.

Background
It was slated to be the second single, but its release was cancelled in favor of "Heartbreaker". Initially, the song was released via airplay on many European radio stations in October 2007, and was subsequently released to US radio. The song was co-written by Fernando Garibay, and was released in the UK on 25 August 2008. It was believed that Nicole Scherzinger was originally due to feature on the track, as in the first verse, will.i.am raps "You want a good nigga to stickwitu", in reference to the Pussycat Dolls song "Stickwitu". The music video for "One More Chance" premiered on Bubble Hits on 31 July 2008. It features will.i.am walking through a town manipulating the scenery around him with his hands to win his ex's favour and give him "one more chance". On August 31, 2008, the song entered the UK Singles Chart at #97.

Track listing
 Promotional CD single
 "One More Chance" (Radio Edit) - 3:53
 "One More Chance" (Dave Audé Remix) - 7:27
 "One More Chance" (Instrumental) - 4:24

 UK CD single / Digital download
 "One More Chance" (Album Version) - 4:24
 "The Donque Song" (Fedde Le Grand Pinkbird Dub Remix) - 5:43

Charts

Release history

References

2008 singles
Will.i.am songs
Songs written by Fernando Garibay
Songs written by will.i.am
2007 songs
Interscope Records singles
2007 singles